Pamiers station (French: Gare de Pamiers) is a railway station in Pamiers, Occitanie, France. The station is served by TER (local) services and Intercités de nuit night services operated by SNCF.

The station is located at kilometric point (KP) 64.220 on the Portet-Saint-Simon–Puigcerdà railway, between the open stations of Le Vernet-d'Ariège and Varilhes. The station was also the origin and branch location of the now closed Pamiers–Limoux railway.

History

It was built by the Chemins de fer du Midi on 19 October 1861 and was the terminus of the line until it was extended to Foix on 7 April 1862. The station used to be a junction onto the now closed Pamiers–Limoux railway from November 1898 to 1939.

The station gained its room in 1903 and the line was electrified in 1927.

Train services
The station is served by the following services:

Night train (Intercités de nuit) Paris–Pamiers–Latour-de-Carol
Regional services (TER Occitanie) Toulouse–Foix–Latour-de-Carol-Enveitg

References

Railway stations in Ariège (department)
Railway stations in France opened in 1861